The 2014 Hillingdon Borough Council election took place on 22 May 2014 to elect members of Hillingdon Council in England. This was on the same day as other local elections.

Results
The Conservative Party retained control winning 42 seats. Labour won 23 seats.

References

Hillingdon
2014